Enterprise Volume Management System (EVMS) was a flexible, integrated volume management software used to manage storage systems under Linux.

Its features include:
 Handle EVMS, Linux LVM and LVM2 volumes
 Handle many kinds of disk partitioning schemes
 Handle many different file systems (Ext2, Ext3, FAT, JFS, NTFS, OCFS2, OpenGFS, ReiserFS, Swap, XFS etc.)
 Multi-disk (MD) management
 Software RAID: level 0, 1, 4 and 5 (no support for level 6 and 10)
 Drive linking (device concatenation)
 Multipath I/O support
 Manage shared cluster storage
 Expand and shrink volumes and file systems online or offline (depending on the file system's capabilities)
 Snapshots (frozen images of volumes), optionally writable
 Conversion between different volume types
 Move partitions
 Make, check and repair file systems
 Bad block relocation
 Three types of user interface: GUI, text mode interface and CLI
 Backup and restore the EVMS metadata

EVMS is licensed under the GNU General Public License version 2 or later. EVMS is supported now in some Linux distributions, among others it is now (2008) SUSE, Debian and Gentoo

LVM vs EVMS 
For a while, both LVM and EVMS were competing for inclusion in the mainline kernel. EVMS had more features and better userland tools, but the internals of LVM were more attractive to kernel developers, so in the end LVM won the battle for inclusion. In response, the EVMS team decided to concentrate on porting the EVMS userland tools to work with the LVM kernelspace.

Sometime after the release of version 2.5.5 on February 26, 2006, IBM discontinued development of the project. There have been no further releases. In 2008 Novell announced that the company would be moving from EVMS to LVM in future editions of their SUSE products, while continuing to fully support customers using EVMS.

References

External links

 

Free software programmed in C
Free system software
Volume manager
Linux file system-related software